"Ooh, What a Life" ("Ooh" on label, "Oooh" on sleeve, often "Oh" in print sources) is a 1979 song by French musical group Gibson Brothers, released as the second single from their fourth album, Cuba (1979). It was a UK No. 10 hit. English DJ and house music producer Joey Negro's 1993 debut album included a version of the song.

Charts

References

1979 songs
1979 singles
Gibson Brothers songs
Polydor Records singles